The Columbus Crew is an American professional soccer team based in Columbus, Ohio, that competes in Major League Soccer (MLS).

This is a list of club records for Columbus, which dates from their inaugural season in 1996 to present.

Honors

Individual Club Awards 
MLS Fair Play Award (5): 1997, 1999, 2004, 2007, 2016

Player records

Appearances

Bold denotes players still playing for the club.

† Includes MLS is Back Tournament knockout round.

Goals

Bold denotes players still playing for the club.

† Includes MLS is Back Tournament knockout round.

Assists

Bold denotes players still playing for the club.

Shutouts

Bold denotes players still playing for the club.

Coaching records

Trophies

International results

By competition

By club
 (Includes: CONCACAF Giants Cup, CONCACAF Champions League, and Campeones Cup)

By nation
 (Includes: CONCACAF Giants Cup, CONCACAF Champions League, and Campeones Cup)

By season

Transfers
As per MLS rules and regulations; some transfer fees have been undisclosed and are not included in the tables below.

Highest transfer fees paid

Highest transfer fees received

References

Columbus Crew
Columbus Crew records and statistics
Columbus Crew